The Palazzo Visconti frescoes are a series of eight frescoes by Donato Bramante, created in 1486-1487, now hanging in the Pinacoteca di Brera, in Milan. They are the only surviving fragments of the decorative scheme in a room of the now-demolished Palazzo Visconti (later renamed the Palazzo Panigarola) on via Lanzone in Milan and were commissioned by its then-owner, privy counsellor Gaspare Ambrogio Visconti. The earliest mention of them is one in the 16th century written by Giovanni Paolo Lomazzo when the cycle in the room was still complete – he states that they showed the most famous soldiers of their time.

It consists of:
 First soldier
 Second soldier
 Third soldier
 Singer
 Man with a club
 Man with a halberd
 Heraclitus and Democritus
 Man with a broadsword
They are shown inside fake architectural niches, which help give them considerable perspectival strength. The figures' clear definition and the clear spatial network help give the figures a sculptural impression. This and their archaeologically researched costumes turn the figures into soldiers of ancient Rome.

The works belong to a Renaissance tradition of cycles of famous people, such as Andrea del Castagno's Famous Men and Women Cycle and Famous Men of the Past and Present in the studiolo of Federico da Montefeltro.

References

Bibliografia
 S. Bandera (ed.), Brera. La Pinacoteca e i suoi capolavori, Skira, Milano 2009.
 Carlo Ludovico Ragghianti (ed.),Pinacoteca di Brera, Arnoldo Mondadori, Milano, 1970
 Mina Gregori (ed.), Pittura a Milano, Rinascimento e Manierismo, Cariplo, Milano 1999.

Paintings by Donato Bramante
Paintings in the collection of the Pinacoteca di Brera
Fresco paintings in Milan
History paintings
1487 paintings